Mount Shalbuzdag is a mountain peak of the Greater Caucasus range, located in the Akhtynsky District of Russia.

References

+
Mountains of Azerbaijan
Mountains of Russia
Lists of coordinates
Geography of the Caucasus
Geography of Azerbaijan